Kalinga Sarpa is a 1984 Indian Kannada film,  directed by  D. Rajendra Babu and produced by Nazre Narayan. The film stars Shankar Nag, Manjula, Vajramuni and Thoogudeepa Srinivas in the lead roles. The film has musical score by Rajan–Nagendra.

Cast

Shankar Nag
Manjula
Vajramuni
Thoogudeepa Srinivas
Sundar Raj
Dinesh
Musuri Krishnamurthy
Leelevathi
K. Vijaya
Uma Shivakumar
Renuka
Chethan Ramarao
Anantharam Maccheri
Bhadrachalam
Bheema Rao
Kannada Raju
Prabhu
Ambareesh

References

External links
 
 

1984 films
1980s Kannada-language films
Films scored by Rajan–Nagendra
Films directed by D. Rajendra Babu